Visa requirements for Singaporean citizens are administrative entry restrictions by the authorities of other states which are imposed on citizens of Singapore.

 Singaporean citizens had visa-free or visa on arrival access to 192 countries and territories, ranking the Singaporean passport 2nd, tied with South Korean passport in terms of number of countries a passport holder can visit without pre-arrival visa arrangements according to the Henley Passport Index.

Changes
Visa requirements for Singaporean citizens were recently lifted by Djibouti (21 January 2018), Uzbekistan (10 February 2018), Armenia (21 March 2018), Angola (30 March 2018), and Guinea (20 November 2018).

In August 2017, Singaporean citizens were made eligible for electronic visas with a validity of 8 days for the Primorye, Kamchatka, and Sakhalin regions of the Russian Far East, for tourism, business and humanitarian purposes. In January 2018, Australia introduced a new 6-year visa for Singaporean citizens. The visitor (subclass 600) visa will allow Singaporean citizens to visit Australia for up to three months at a time within a 6-year period on a single application, up from 12 months under the pre-existing Electronic Travel Authority (ETA). In September 2019, Saudi Arabia made Singaporean citizens eligible for either an e-Visa or a visa on arrival as part of its plans to diversify its economy by developing its tourist industry.

Visa requirements map

Visa requirements
Visa requirements for holders of normal passports travelling for tourist purposes:

Pre-approved visas pick-up
Pre-approved visas can be picked up on arrival in the following countries instead in embassy or consulate.

Territories and disputed areas
Visa requirements for Singaporean citizens for visits to various territories, disputed areas, partially recognised countries and restricted zones:

Visas for Cambodia, Myanmar, Rwanda, São Tomé and Príncipe, Senegal, Sri Lanka and Turkey are obtainable online.

APEC Business Travel Card

Holders of an APEC Business Travel Card (ABTC) travelling on business do not require a visa to the following countries:

1 – up to 90 days
2 – up to 60 days
3 – up to 59 days

The card must be used in conjunction with a passport and has the following advantages:
undertake legitimate business in participating economies
expedited border crossing in all member economies, including transitional members
expedited scheduling of visa interview (United States)

Automated border control systems

Singaporean citizens aged 6 and older are eligible to use the automated clearance lanes at the ICA Checkpoints run by the Immigration and Checkpoints Authority, provided that their biometric identifiers (iris / facial / fingerprints) have been enrolled with ICA. In addition, for young Singapore citizens who wish to use the automated lanes but had collected their passports before turning six, they may enrol their biometrics at the manned immigration counters (with the supervision of their parent / guardian).

In addition, Singaporean citizens who intend to travel as tourists, are eligible to use the automated border control systems (eGates) when arriving in (or departing from) the following countries:

a) The Trusted Traveller Program offered by the Immigration Services Agency of Japan (ISA), is limited to:

- directors or full-time employees of the Government of Singapore and its public and corporate affiliates.

- directors or full-time employees of international organizations.

- directors or full-time employees of public companies listed in Japan and their subsidiaries.

- directors or full-time employees of public companies listed in the visa-exempt countries under Japanese visa policy.

- directors or full-time employees of private companies with capital or investment of JPY 500 million.

- business relationship foreign invitee of Japanese government-affiliated institutions or Japanese publicly listed corporations (and their subsidiaries).

- tourists with platinum or higher-status credit cards.

- spouse or child (unmarried minor) of aforementioned businesspeople or high-net-worth tourists.

b) The Smart Gates at Dubai Airport can only be used after the first-time arrival and registration at the manual immigration touchpoint in Dubai.

Non-visa restrictions

See also

 Visa policy of Singapore
 Singapore passport

References and Notes
References

Notes

External links
Issuing of Singapore passports
Visa Information for Singapore passports; Provided by Singapore Ministry of Foreign Affairs

Singapore
Foreign relations of Singapore